John Hamilton Tanton (February 23, 1934 – July 16, 2019) was an American ophthalmologist, white nationalist and anti-immigration activist. He was the founder and first chairman of the Federation for American Immigration Reform (FAIR), an anti-immigration organization. He was the co-founder of the Center for Immigration Studies, an anti-immigration think tank; and NumbersUSA, an anti-immigration lobbying group. He was chairman of U.S. English and ProEnglish. He was briefly President of Zero Population Growth. He was the founder of The Social Contract Press, which published a quarterly journal of nativist and white nationalist writers called The Social Contract until Fall 2019. He founded the pro-eugenics organization Society for Genetic Education.

Early life
Tanton was born in 1934 in Detroit. In 1945, he moved with his family to a farm northeast of Bay City, Michigan, on which his mother had been raised and on which he worked.

Tanton graduated with a bachelor's degree in chemistry from Michigan State University in 1956, received an M.D. from the University of Michigan in 1960, and received an M.S. in ophthalmology from the University of Michigan in 1964.

Career
Tanton ran an ophthalmology practice in Petoskey, Michigan.

Political advocacy
Tanton was an anti-immigration activist. He was the founder and patron of many anti-immigration non-profit organizations, including ProEnglish. By 2019, six anti-immigrant groups founded by Tanton were designated as hate groups by the Southern Poverty Law Center.

Earlier in his advocacy career, he founded the Petoskey chapter of the Sierra Club and became an active member and then president of Zero Population Growth in 1975. Unable to secure support from colleagues in these groups to limit immigration, in 1979 he founded the non-profit Federation for American Immigration Reform (FAIR) with early support from Warren Buffett and Eugene McCarthy, with the promise that it would be "centrist/liberal in political orientation". In 1983, he co-founded U.S. English with former United States Senator S. I. Hayakawa to advocate for making English the official language of the United States.

Additionally, Tanton co-founded and was heavily involved in the Center for Immigration Studies (CIS), Numbers USA, the American Immigration Control Foundation, American Patrol/Voices of Citizens Together, Californians for Population Stabilization, and ProjectUSA. Donations flow through U.S. Inc., which also supports Scenic Michigan, the International Dark-Sky Association, the Foreign Policy Association's Great Decisions Series, and the Harbor Springs chapter of the North Country Trail Association. Tanton served on the Board of Population-Environment Balance.

Tanton founded the Social Contract Press in 1990. He served as its publisher. Additionally, he was the editor-in-chief of its journal, The Social Contract, since 1998. He co-authored the book The Immigrant Invasion with Wayne Lutton, which was published by the Social Contract Press in 1994.

Promotion of eugenics
According to CNN, Tanton "has openly embraced eugenics, the science of improving the genetic quality of the human population by encouraging selective breeding and at times, advocating for the sterilization of genetically undesirable groups." Tanton wrote a paper in 1975 arguing for "passive eugenics" whereby child-bearing would be restricted to those between the ages of 20 and 35. He also founded the pro-eugenics organization, the Society for Genetic Education (SAGE).

Opposition to immigration 
According to Rafael Bernal of the Hill, Tanton's opposition to immigration was "on the grounds of population reduction and protection of an ethnic white majority". According to the New York Times, Tanton over time increasingly made his case against immigration in "racial terms". According to the New York Times, Tanton also said "One of my prime concerns is about the decline of folks who look like you and me ... for European-American society and culture to persist requires a European-American majority, and a clear one at that."

Resignation from U.S. English
In 1988, shortly before a referendum in Arizona to make English the state's official language, a memo written by Tanton was leaked to the media. The Arizona Republic published a 1986 memo from Tanton. 

After the memo was published, executive director Linda Chavez resigned, former supporters of the group, including Walter Cronkite, Saul Bellow, and Gore Vidal, also ended their association, and Tanton resigned from his position as chairman of the group. Tanton complained that he had been smeared as a racist.

Funding of FAIR
Under Tanton's leadership FAIR was criticized for taking funding for many years from the Pioneer Fund, a non-profit foundation dedicated to "improving the character of the American people" by, among other things, promoting the practice of eugenics, or selective breeding.  FAIR responded to this criticism by asserting that the Pioneer Fund clearly states that it supports equal opportunity for all Americans, regardless of race, religion, national origin, or ethnicity; that other major organizations, including universities in the United States and other countries, have also accepted grants from the Fund; and that the Pioneer Fund's contributions to FAIR were used only for the general operation of the organization.

Southern Poverty Law Center criticism
Both FAIR and Social Contract Press are designated as hate groups by the Southern Poverty Law Center (SPLC). In 2001, the SPLC included these groups, and Tanton, in a list of inter-connected network of anti-immigration groups which espouse bigotry, either openly, or thinly disguised.

In February 2009, the SPLC again described his views as racist. Tanton's environmentalist and anti-immigration activities are well-documented in 15 file boxes of archives he donated to the Bentley Historical Library at the University of Michigan. Another 10 file boxes are sealed until 2035. A February 2009 Southern Poverty Law Center report examined Tanton's written correspondence highlighted alleged connections between Tanton's anti-immigration efforts and white supremacist, neo-Nazi and pro-eugenics leaders.
The introduction to the report read:

FAIR, CIS and NumbersUSA are all part of a network of restrictionist organizations conceived and created by John Tanton, the "puppeteer" of the nativist movement and a man with deep racist roots. As the first article in this report shows, Tanton has for decades been at the heart of the white nationalist scene. He has met with leading white supremacists and associated closely with the leaders of a eugenicist foundation once described by a leading newspaper as a "neo-Nazi organization." He has made a series of racist statements about Latinos and worried that they were outbreeding whites. At one point, he wrote candidly that to maintain American culture, "a European-American majority" is required.

Tanton rejected the Southern Poverty Law Center's accusations of being a racist and eugenicist in a 2010 article, "SPLC’s MO: Audacter calumniare semper aliquid haeret (slander boldly, something always sticks)".

Personal life
Tanton was married to Mary Lou Tanton. She chairs the U.S. Immigration Reform PAC. She also co-founded Scenic Michigan.

Tanton had Parkinson's disease for his last 16 years. He died in Petoskey on July 16, 2019.

References

External links
 The Puppeteer Replies, by John Tanton - John Tanton's reply to the Southern Poverty Law Center Puppeteer article
 Father of Anti-Immigration Movement Awaits History’s Judgment, by Jonathan Tilove, The Grand Rapids Press (April 23, 2006). (© Newhouse News) (Profile of Tanton)
 Common Sense on Mass Immigration, published by John Tanton's The Social Contract is an introductory collection of mini-essays in 40-page softcover pocket-sized booklet.
 The Ethics of Immigration Policy, published by John Tanton's The Social Contract is a downloadable collection of mini-essays, also published in a 40-page softcover pocket-sized booklet.

1934 births
2019 deaths
Physicians from Detroit
People from Petoskey, Michigan
People associated with Planned Parenthood
English-only movement
American conservationists
Anti-immigration activists
American non-fiction environmental writers
Sustainability advocates
University of Michigan Medical School alumni
American eugenicists
American white nationalists
Activists from Detroit